Vanessa Hazel Ouwehand (born 30 December 1999) is a New Zealand swimmer. She competed in the women's 50 metre butterfly event at the 2018 FINA World Swimming Championships (25 m), in Hangzhou, China.

References

External links
 

1999 births
Living people
New Zealand female swimmers
New Zealand female butterfly swimmers
Place of birth missing (living people)
21st-century New Zealand women
Swimmers at the 2022 Commonwealth Games
Commonwealth Games competitors for New Zealand